The Ralamandal Wildlife Sanctuary was established in 1989 in Indore, Madhya Pradesh. It is spread over five square kilometres and is home to different species of birds and other wildlife. It has an ancient palace built by Holkars which was primarily used as a hunting hut also known as shikargah (hunting lodge).

About
Long back, the place served as a hunting ground for the royal family members of Holkars as it had a huge population of tigers, leopards and deers. In order to protect animals and birds from noise and air pollution emanating from nearby highway, a green wall of about 10,000 trees was created. It is 180 metres long and 6 metres wide.

Fauna and flora
The majority of the Fauna includes Leopard, Black Buck, Sambar, Chital, Blue bull, Jarak, Bhedki (Barking deer) Rabbit etc. while Teak, Saja, Chandan, Eucalyptus, Babul, Bamboo etc. are the among the popular available Flora.

References

Wildlife sanctuaries in Madhya Pradesh
Tourist attractions in Indore district
1989 establishments in Madhya Pradesh
Protected areas established in 1989